Canistrum aurantiacum is a plant species in the genus Canistrum. This species is endemic to Brazil.

Cultivars
 × Canmea 'Carmin'

References

BSI Cultivar Registry Retrieved 11 October 2009

aurantiacum
Flora of Brazil